Eugene Green Hamilton (June 27, 1910 – June 1, 2005) was a pioneering American OB/GYN obstetrician, writer, and medical researcher. He did some of the key writing in the effort to develop a vaccine which fought against Rh disease, a condition which would cause pregnant women's immune system to attack the fetus she is carrying as not being identical to the mother. Hamilton did some of the earliest and best writing about the search for the vaccine, long before diagnostic techniques such as ultrasound had been developed.

Biography 
Hamilton was born on June 27, 1910, in White Hall, Illinois. His father was Ray Hamilton, an Illinois physician. In the early 1940s, he married Mary Jo Hickey of Minnesota. They had three children: Barbara, Eugene Jr., and John, who also became an OB/GYN.

He studied medicine at the University of Illinois at Urbana-Champaign, receiving his degree in 1941, and then worked as an OB/GYN doctor in several different hospitals, including St. Mary's Health Center. He had a private practice in St. Charles, Missouri, which he eventually passed on to his son John. Hamilton was also a professor at Saint Louis University.

Hamilton died on June 1, 2005, of congestive heart failure, in St. Louis, leaving three children and five grandchildren: Eugene G. III, Katherine, Paul, Julie, and Eric.

Writing 
 The Rh Factor
 "The Green Journal"
 "Inner Uterus Blood Transfusions" – 1960s

See also 
 Rhesus blood group system
 Rh disease
 Rho(D) Immune Globulin

References 
 St. Louis Post Dispatch, June 3, 2005, obituary
 St. Louis Business Journal, January 31, 2003, "Hamilton, Ahlering, Gall pinched by insurance hikes"
 "ISO-Immunization" (PDF)
 Universitas, 2005, SLU Newsletter (PDF)

1910 births
2005 deaths
American medical researchers
American medical writers
American male non-fiction writers
American obstetricians
People from White Hall, Illinois
People from St. Charles, Missouri
20th-century American male writers